Gaspard Abeille (Riez, 1648 – Paris, 22 May 1718) was a French lyric and tragic poetry poet. He received the title of Abbé and in 1704 was elected a member of the Académie française. His brother Scipion was also a poet and a surgeon.

Plays 
 Argélie, reine de Thessalie, five-act tragedy, in verse, Paris, Théâtre de l'Hôtel de Bourgogne, novembre 1673
 Coriolan, five-act tragedy, in verse, Paris, Théâtre de l'Hôtel Guénégaud, 24 janvier 1676
 Lyncée, five-act tragedy, in verse, Paris, Théâtre de l'Hôtel de Bourgogne, 25 février 1678
 Soliman, five-act tragedy, in verse, Paris, Théâtre de l'Hôtel de Bourgogne, 11 octobre 1680
 Crispin bel esprit, one-act comedy, in verse, Paris, Théâtre de l'Hôtel Guénégaud, 11 juillet 1681
 Hercule, five-act tragedy, in verse, Paris, Théâtre de l'Hôtel Guénégaud, 7 novembre 1681

1648 births
1718 deaths
People from Alpes-de-Haute-Provence
Members of the Académie Française
17th-century French poets
17th-century French male writers
17th-century French dramatists and playwrights